Mulavana  is a village in Kollam district in the state of Kerala, India. The place is filled with almost all types of shops,which includes stationary,fancy,textile etc. The Mulavana fish market is regarded as the best market while comparing with the surrounding places.

Demographics
Mulavana is a small village located in Kollam Taluka of Kollam district, Kerala with total 9289 families residing. The Mulavana village has population of 35887 of which 17038 are males while 18849 are females as per Population Census 2011.
 
In Mulavana village population of children with age 0-6 is 3399 which makes up 9.47% of total population of village. Average Sex Ratio of Mulavana village is 1106 which is higher than Kerala state average of 1084. Child Sex Ratio for the Mulavana as per census is 1044, higher than Kerala average of 964.
 
Mulavana village has higher literacy rate compared to Kerala. In 2011, literacy rate of Mulavana village was 95.53% compared to 94.00% of Kerala. In Mulavana Male literacy stands at 96.69% while female literacy rate was 94.50%.

Places of worship
Mulavana Sree Madankavu Temple
Mulavana Chokkamkuzhi Sree BhadraKali Bhagavati Temple. (ചൊക്കംകുഴി അമ്പലം )
Perayam Bharanikavu Devi Temple
Mulavana Mahadevar Temple
Mulavana Nadukkunnil Bhadradevi temple
Jumma Ath punnathadam
Kristhuraj Church, Kottapuram,
Perayam Marthoma Church
Kanjiracode St Michale's Church
St. Kuriakose Orthodox Church

Schools

Mulavana Govt. LP school 
MT LP School
PKJM School
SSLPS Mulavana

References

Villages in Kollam district